Adam Pazio (born 27 September 1992) is a Polish professional footballer who plays as a full-back for III liga club Olimpia Zambrów.

Honours
Polonia Warsaw
III liga, group I: 2021–22

References

External links
 
 

1992 births
Living people
Polish footballers
Poland youth international footballers
Poland under-21 international footballers
Association football defenders
Lechia Gdańsk players
Podbeskidzie Bielsko-Biała players
Ruch Chorzów players
MKP Pogoń Siedlce players
Kotwica Kołobrzeg footballers
Polonia Warsaw players
Olimpia Zambrów players
Ekstraklasa players
I liga players
II liga players
III liga players
Sportspeople from Masovian Voivodeship
People from Wołomin